Fords Farm is a suburb in West Berkshire, west of Reading.  Overall, it is in the Royal County of Berkshire in England. Fords Farm lies south of the Bath Road 3-4 miles west of the centre of Reading.

References

External links

Suburbs of Reading, Berkshire